The 5th award ceremony of the Feroz Awards was held at Polideportivo Antonio Magariños, in Madrid, on January 22, 2018. It was hosted by Julián López and aired on #0.

Winners and nominees
The nominees were announced on December 5, 2017.

Film

Television

Feroz de Honor
Verónica Forqué

See also
32nd Goya Awards

References

Feroz Awards
2018 in Madrid
January 2018 events in Spain